Puca Mauras (possibly from Quechua puka red) is a  volcano in the Andes of Peru. It is situated in the Arequipa Region, Castilla Province, Chachas District. Puca Mauras lies in the western extensions of the Chila mountain range, west of a lake named Cochapunco (possibly from in the Quechua spelling Qucha P'unqu).

References

Mountains of Arequipa Region
Mountains of Peru